Tschingelsee is a lake in the valley Kiental of the Canton of Berne, Switzerland. The lake formed on Tschingelalp in 1972 after severe weather. Since 1987 the area has been a nature preserve.

Tschingel
Lakes of the canton of Bern
1972 establishments in Switzerland
LTschingelsee